Jojo Chintoh (born  1944) is a Ghanaian-Canadian television journalist who worked as a feature and documentary reporter for Citytv in Toronto until 2009–10.

Biography
Born in Ghana, Chintoh moved to Canada in 1969. He became editor of several newspapers, including Contrast, before joining Citytv in 1978. He was hired at a time when Moses Znaimer was making efforts to have television personalities reflect the diverse cultures of the city, and Chintoh was the first black reporter on the station. He focused on crime reporting for the station in the early 1990s.

In 1985, Chintoh received a CanPro award and a Gemini award nomination for his series Down and Out in Parkdale. He received the 1984 Sovereign Award from the Canadian Racing Community for his Quest for the Plate series.

References

External links
 

1940s births
Ghanaian emigrants to Canada
Canadian television journalists
Black Canadian broadcasters
Living people